Alabama Adventure & Splash Adventure (previously known as VisionLand, Alabama Adventure, Splash Adventure and Alabama Splash Adventure) is a water park and amusement park in Bessemer, Alabama. It is owned by Koch Family Parks, which consists of members of the family who formerly had minority ownership in Holiday World & Splashin' Safari.

History

Originally known as VisionLand, the park was built largely as a result of efforts by Fairfield mayor Larry Langford. Eleven cities came together to form the West Jefferson Amusement and Public Park Authority and with help from the Alabama Legislature, the group borrowed $60 million to build the park. Construction began in March 1997, and the park opened for business on May 23, 1998. The park opened with four major areas, including Celebration City Theme Park, Steel Waters Water Park, a children's area called Marvel City, and a shopping/dining area known as Main Street.

In 1999, the park expanded, adding Wilde River Gorge, a river rapids attraction. Dino Domain, a dinosaur-themed walk through exhibit featuring animatronic dinosaurs, was built in the woods behind Main Street but closed after the season.

In 2001, Wild River Gorge reopened with minor adjustments along with Stratosfear Screamer, an S&S Power twin tower attraction.

The park filed Chapter 9 bankruptcy in 2002, and only operated Steel Waters. Themeparks LLC, an amusement park company, known for their success with Kentucky Kingdom in Louisville, Kentucky, was interested in Visionland and made a bid for the park, but the price for the park ended up being too high. The park was then purchased by Southland Entertainment Group for $5.25 million, a loss of approximately $26 million in public funds.

In 2003, Visionland (uncapitalizing the "L") reopened with Magic Adventure Theme Park, Splash Beach Water Park, Marvel City, and Celebration Street. Magic Adventure received a scrambler attraction called Wild Scrambler and Splash Beach received a wave pool named Kahuna Waves and a nine-story-tall free fall slide called Acapulco Drop. Starting that season park guests had the option to buy tickets to either the amusement park or the water park or a combo ticket to both parks.

Splash Beach received a new water attraction called Splashdown!, a toilet bowl-style ride in 2004.

In 2005, Magic Adventure opened the first new roller coaster since the park's opening named Zoomerang, a Vekoma Boomerang roller coaster relocated from Sydney, Australia. The park also re-opened one of the former attractions named Cahaba Falls, a log flume attraction. It was later known as Woodchuck Run. The park held naming contests for both attractions on its website. The theme park was visited by approximately 345,000 people, making the park Alabama's second-most popular tourist destination according to the Bureau of Tourism and Travel and trailing only the Birmingham Zoo.

Southland announced in 2006, the rebranding of the park under the Alabama Adventure name, along with major expansion plans, including a hotel with an indoor water park, an RV park, and other amenities. Magic Adventure was renamed Magic City USA to reflect the new theming strategy. The park also announced plans for a summer concert series, featuring popular musical acts and artists. The number of visitors to Alabama Adventure rose to more than 388,000. It was the winner of Alabama's "2007 Attraction of the Year."

In 2007, the park added two new attractions, including Vertigo, one of the original attractions of VisionLand, which had been removed in 2003, and Salamander Bay, a re-themed children's play area at Splash Beach formerly known as Quarry Bay. The summer concert series returned to the park and became an annual event.

Southland Entertainment sold the park to Adrenaline Family Entertainment, a group of former executives of Six Flags in 2008. Southland concentrated on developing the remaining acreage that it owns adjacent to the park, with plans for hotels, an RV park, and other amenities.

In 2009, the park announced the first major expansion since 2005, and the first to Splash Beach since 2004. The expansion included a new attraction from WhiteWater West called "UpSurge!", a 216-foot flume slide with a vertical half pipe ending in a 25,000-gallon splash pool. The park also combined both parks into one ticket price.

The park began promoting a casting call for new "indoor theatrical entertainment" called "Beat Street" that premiered in the brand new Star Theater in 2010. The park also relaunched its website, branding the park as Alabama Adventure Water and Theme Park.

Buzzsaw Falls, a SkyTrans Manufacturing Shoot the Chutes ride was added in 2011, but only lasted for one summer. It was located between the parks Celebration Street and Stratos Fear Screamer tower ride. This ride was purchased by Schlitterbahn in Corpus Christi, Texas where it was renamed "Padre Plunge".

Adrenaline Family Entertainment sold the park on January 5, 2012, to General Attractions LLC, a company created by the former owners of the park who previously sold the park in 2008. It was announced on April 5, 2012 that the amusement park section would be closed, leaving only water rides. The park was renamed Splash Adventure for its 2012 opening season. Also for 2012, three new attractions were added to the water park. One of their new attractions was called the "Mist-ical Maze" where in this attraction you go through a maze that has trigger water chutes and many other surprises. The second new attraction was a wipeout designed ride from WhiteWater West called "Wipeout Adventure Course" and the third new attraction was a zip-line that goes around the waterpark. There was a "Dive-In Movie" at Kahuna Waves every Friday night from Memorial Day weekend to the end of July.

In March 2014, Koch Family Parks, founded by former Holiday World & Splashin' Safari CEO Dan Koch and his sister Natalie, purchased the park. New additions to the park included five new kids rides consisting of a new kids roller coaster, a train, two boat rides, mini helicopters and a laser maze.

In 2015 Rampage, the park's signature wooden roller coaster, reopened after a complete restoration.

In 2018, the park added new attractions including a rocking tugboat, scrambler, a fast-spinning ride, a yo-yo swing ride, a miniature children's train ride, and a children's water slide complex. They also introduced a weekend autumn festival in October of that same year. A year later, for the 2019 season, the park introduced three new attractions; Freefall, a 75 foot tall tall water slide; Galleon, a pirate ship ride; and Twister, a body slide located by Freefall.

For 2022, this amusement park introduced "Cheddar Chase", a wild mouse roller coaster ride previously from Lake Winnepesaukah in Georgia and Self Powered Bikes for kids to replace "Crank and Roll". In addition, its water park attraction "Castaway Island" was renamed "Cocoa Island".

Incidents and accidents
 In 1999, when the park was called Visionland, five people were injured when a raft on the Wild River Gorge rapids ride overturned.
 In 2001, a raft on the Wild River Gorge filled with park employees overturned when the employees rocked the boat. No one was injured.
 In August 2009, a family of three and one other park visitor were injured when the Wild River Gorge's boat capsized. Witnesses said that the family's boat hit an empty boat and was overturned. The family was underwater for approximately 20 seconds.
 In June 2011, a fight broke out between several youths and spread throughout the park. One guest described it as a "borderline riot." The Bessemer Police were called to the park and no more guests were allowed into the park. It was blamed on a "$10 before 10AM" promotion the park ran.
In June 2018, a ten-year-old boy hit his head while floating along the Warrior River. Lifeguards came to his aid and the boy was subsequently sent to Children's Hospital.

Current attractions

Water attractions/rides

Dry rides

Former attractions

See also
 2012 in amusement parks

References

External links
Alabama Splash Adventure official site

Amusement parks in Alabama
Bessemer, Alabama
Water parks in Alabama
Buildings and structures in Jefferson County, Alabama
Tourist attractions in Jefferson County, Alabama
Animatronic attractions
1998 establishments in Alabama
Amusement parks opened in 1998